= Fondo Protonotaro =

Collection of documents at the state Archive of Palermo

Fondo Protonotaro is a collection of documents at the state Archive of Palermo, in which are registered, among other records, all the acts pertaining to baronies and other feudal properties in Sicily before the abolition of feudalism in 1812. This was consistent with feudal law which requires at the death of a vassal or lord the feudal investiture of his successor. Acting for the Crown, the High Notary also undertook investiture upon a subject's purchase of a manor. As in other realms, in the Kingdom of Sicily feudal investiture was based on a pledge of homage and fealty. These are primary sources, and the nearest thing to a complete record or list of Sicily's feudal nobility.
